Hutton & Hockings was an architectural firm in Rockhampton, Queensland, Australia. Some of their works are now heritage-listed.

History 
Two architects, Alfred Mowbray Hutton and Edwin Morton Hockings formed a partnership from 1898 until 1904, known as Hutton and Hockings, Architects and Building Surveyors.

Significant works 
Significant works of Hutton & Hockings include:
 Walter Reid Community Arts Centre (a warehouse for Walter Reid & Co, now a community arts centre)

References 

Architecture firms of Australia